Anania obtusalis is a moth in the family Crambidae. It was described by Hiroshi Yamanaka in 1987. It is found in Honshu, Japan.

References

Moths described in 1987
Pyraustinae
Moths of Japan